Majed Aman (Arabic: ماجد أمان; born 6 September 1994) is a Qatari footballer. He currently plays for Al-Kharaitiyat.

References

External links
 

Qatari footballers
1994 births
Living people
Al-Arabi SC (Qatar) players
Al-Khor SC players
Al Kharaitiyat SC players
Qatar SC players
Qatar Stars League players
Qatari Second Division players
Association football fullbacks